Abortion in Paraguay is illegal except in case of the threat to the life of the woman. Anyone who performs an abortion can be sentenced to 15 to 30 months in prison. If the abortion is done without the consent of the woman, the punishment is increased to 2 to 5 years. If the death of the woman occurred as a result of the abortion, the person who did the procedure can be sentenced to 4 to 6 years in prison, and 5 to 10 years in cases in which she did not consent.

In Paraguay, 23 out of 100 deaths of young women are the result of illegal abortions. Concerning this death rate, Paraguay has one of the highest in the region.

In April 2015, a story about a 10-year-old Paraguayan girl who was 22 weeks pregnant as a result of having allegedly been raped and impregnated by her stepfather came to light. The pregnancy had been discovered that same month after the girl's mother brought her to a local hospital for abdominal pain, which was found to have been related to the pregnancy. Calls from her mother as well as outraged members of the public throughout the world for permission to allow the girl to undergo an abortion procedure were ultimately denied. The girl gave birth to the child via a caesarean section in a Red Cross hospital in Paraguay's capital city of Asunción later that year. The girl's stepfather has since been prosecuted for the rape and her mother had also been charged with negligence for her alleged role in the circumstances surrounding the rape and pregnancy of her daughter. The high-profile nature of this case has led opposition leftist parties to push for less restrictive abortion laws in Paraguay, such as in cases of child pregnancies and in cases of sexual assault. The United Nations has found that the maternal death rate is four times higher for girls under the age of 16 in Latin America. The 10-year-old girl reportedly survived the birth, and her mother and grandmother both requested legal custody of the newborn child.

See also
Abortion
Abortion by country
Abortion law
Domestic violence in Paraguay
Health in Paraguay
Women in Paraguay

References

Paraguay
Paraguay
Law of Paraguay
Health in Paraguay
Society of Paraguay
Women's rights in Paraguay